Herbert Eugene Caen (April 3, 1916  February 1, 1997) was a San Francisco humorist and journalist whose daily column of local goings-on and insider gossip, social and political happenings, and offbeat puns and anecdotes—"A continuous love letter to San Francisco"—appeared in the San Francisco Chronicle for almost sixty years (excepting a relatively brief defection to The San Francisco Examiner) and made him a household name throughout the San Francisco Bay Area.

"The secret of Caen's success", wrote the editor of a rival publication, was:

A special Pulitzer Prize called him the "voice and conscience" of San Francisco.

Career

Caen was born to a Jewish father and a non-Jewish mother. Herbert Eugene Caen was born April 3, 1916, in Sacramento, California, although he liked to point out that his parentspool hall operator Lucien Caen and Augusta (Gross) Caenhad spent the summer nine months previous at the Panama Pacific International Exposition in San Francisco. After high school (where he wrote a column titled "Corridor Gossip") he covered sports for The Sacramento Union; in later years he occasionally referred to himself as "the Sacamenna Kid."

In 1936, Caen began writing a radio programming column for the San Francisco Chronicle. When that column was discontinued in 1938, Caen proposed a daily column on the city itself; "It's News to Me" first appeared July 5. Excepting Caen's four years in the United States Army Air Forces during World War II and a 19501958 stint at The San Francisco Examiner, his column appeared every day except Saturday until 1990, when it dropped to five times per week"more than 16,000 columns of 1,000 words each ... an astounding and unduplicated feat, by far the longest-running newspaper column in the country."

A colleague wrote in 1996:

Caen had considerable influence on popular culture, particularly its language. He coined the term beatnik in 1958 and popularized hippie during San Francisco's 1967 Summer of Love. He popularized obscureoften playfulterms such as Frisbeetarianism, and ribbed nearby Berkeley as Berserkeley for its often-radical politics. His many recurring if irregular features included "Namephreaks"people with names (aptronyms) peculiarly appropriate or inappropriate to their vocations or avocations, such as
substitute teacher Mr. Fillin, hospital spokesman Pam Talkington, periodontist Dr. Rott, piano teacher Patience Scales, orthopedic specialist Dr. Kneebone, and the Vatican's spokesman on the evils of rock 'n roll, Cardinal Rapsong.

Among the colorful personalities making periodic appearances in Caen's columns was Edsel Ford Fung, whose local reputation as "the world's rudest waiter" was due in no small part to Caen, who lamented his death in 1984:

Although Caen relied on "an army of reliable tipsters," all items were fact-checked.

Now and then an item (usually a joke or pun) was credited to a mysterious "Strange de Jim," whose first contribution ("Since I didn't believe in reincarnation in any of my other lives, why should I have to believe in it in this one?") appeared in 1972. 
Sometimes suspected to be a Caen alter ego, de Jim (whose letters bore no return address, and who met Caen only onceby chance) was revealed after Caen's death to be a Castro District writer who, despite several coy interviews with the press, remains publicly anonymous.

Caen took special pleasure in "seeing what he could sneak by his editorshis 'naughties, such as this item about a shopper looking for a Barbie doll:
Does Barbie come with Ken?' he asked the perky saleswoman. 'Actually no,' she answered slyly. 'Barbie comes with G.I. Joeshe fakes it with Ken.

On Sundays, current items were set aside in favor of "Mr. San Francisco's" reflections on his unconditional love for his adopted city, musing on (for example): 

An occasional column was given over to serious matters, such as a May 1, 1960, piece on the upcoming execution of Caryl Chessman, which included Caen's recollection of witnessing a hanging as a young reporter:

On December 12, 1960, Caen wrote:

Powers received almost a hundred cards, most from the San Francisco Bay Area.

A collection of essays, Baghdad-by-the-Bay (a term he'd coined to reflect San Francisco's exotic multiculturalism) was published in 1949, and Don't Call It Friscoafter a local judge's 1918 rebuke to an out-of-town petitioner ("No one refers to San Francisco by that title except people from Los Angeles")appeared in 1953.
The Cable Car and the Dragon, a children's picture book, was published in 1972.

In 1993, he told an interviewer that he declined to retire because "my name wouldn't be in the paper and I wouldn't know if I was dead or alive," adding that his obituary would be his last column: "It will trail off at the end, where I fall face down on the old Royal with my nose on the 'I' key."

Honors 

In April 1996 Caen received a special Pulitzer Prize (which he called his Pullet Surprise) for "extraordinary and continuing contribution as a voice and conscience of his city." (Fellow Chronicle columnist Art Hoppe, who had sworn an oath with Caen twenty-five years earlier not to accept a Pulitzer, released him from the oath without being asked.)
The following month
doctors treating him for pneumonia discovered he had inoperable lung cancer.
He told his readers: "In a lightning flash I passed from the world of the well to the world of the unwell, where I hope to dwell for what I hope is a long time. The point is not to be maudlin or Pollyanna cheerful. This is serious stuff."

June 14, 1996, was officially celebrated in San Francisco as Herb Caen Day.
After a motorcade and parade ending at the Ferry Building, Caen was honored by "a pantheon of the city's movers, shakers, celebrities and historical figures" including television news legend Walter Cronkite. Noting that several San Francisco mayors (sitting or retired) were at liberty to attend, Caen quipped, "Obviously, the Grand Jury hasn't been doing its job."

Among other honors a promenade along the city's historic bayfront Embarcadero was christened
—a reference to what Caen called his "three-dot journalism" for the ellipses separating his column's short items.
This was particularly appropriate given the recent demolition of an eyesore against which Caen had long campaigned: the elevated Embarcadero Freeway, built astride the Embarcadero forty years earlier and derided by Caen as "The Dambarcadero." A tribute was inserted in the Congressional Record.

Caen continued to write, though less frequently. He died February 1, 1997. His funeralheld at Grace Cathedral despite his Jewish heritage
("the damndest saddest, most wonderful funeral anyone ever had, but the only man who could properly describe it isn't here," said Enrico Banducci)
was followed by a candlelight procession to Aquatic Park, where his will had provided for a fireworks display—climaxed by a pyrotechnic image of the manual typewriter he had long called his "Loyal Royal".

"No other newspaper columnist ever has been so long synonymous with a specific place... Part of his appeal seemed to lie in the endless bonhomie he projected," said his New York Times obituary, comparing him to Walter Winchell "but with the malice shorn off."

The Chronicle projected a one-fifth decline in subscriptions—surveys had shown that Caen was better-read than the front page. Reprints of his columns remain a periodic feature of the Chronicle.

Bibliography

The San Francisco Book, Photographs by Max Yavno, Houghton Mifflin Company, Boston/The Riverside Press, Cambridge, 1948.
Baghdad by the Bay, Garden City, NY: Doubleday & Company, 1949.
Baghdad:  1951, Doubleday & Company, Inc., Garden City, N.Y., 1950.
Don't Call It Frisco, Garden City, NY: Doubleday & Company, 1953.
Herb Caen's Guide to San Francisco, Doubleday & Company, Inc., Garden City, New York, 1957.
Only in San Francisco, Doubleday & Company, Inc., Garden City, N.Y., 1960.
San Francisco: City on Golden Hills, illustrated by Dong Kingman, Doubleday & Company, Inc., Garden City, New York, 1967.
The Cable Car and the Dragon, illustrated by Barbara Ninde Byfield. Doubleday (1972), reprinted by Chronicle Books (1986) (children's picture book)
’’One Man’s San Francisco’’, Doubleday & Company Inc., Garden City, New York, 1976.
Above San Francisco, with Robert Cameron. Aerial photographs of historic and contemporary San Francisco, with text by Caen. (1986)

Notes

References

Further reading
 Morse, Rob (June 25, 1986). "No Comparison". The San Francisco Examiner. p. 35

External links

chronology
One of Caen's columns 
Collection of Caen's columns
 (under 'Caen, Herb, 1916-' without '1997')
Nuts, crooks and judges enliven SF Jewish who's who
"The 1996 Pulitzer Prize Winners: Special Awards and Citations. Works.". The Pulitzer Prizes. Reprints of four tributes to Caen published April 10, 1996

American columnists
1916 births
1997 deaths
20th-century American journalists
American male journalists
Deaths from lung cancer in California
Jewish American journalists
Pulitzer Prize winners for journalism
San Francisco Chronicle people
San Francisco Examiner people
United States Army Air Forces personnel of World War II
Writers from Sacramento, California
Writers from San Francisco
20th-century American Jews